Pleasant Township is a township of Wright County, Iowa, United States.

References

Townships in Wright County, Iowa
Townships in Iowa